Bielle is a commune of the Pyrénées-Atlantiques department in southwestern France.

See also
 Ossau Valley
Communes of the Pyrénées-Atlantiques department

References

External links

 http://www.bielle-en-ossau.com/2008/07/28/a-guided-tour-of-the-village/

Communes of Pyrénées-Atlantiques
Pyrénées-Atlantiques communes articles needing translation from French Wikipedia